George Daniels may refer to:

George Daniels (watchmaker) (1926–2011), English horologist
George B. Daniels (born 1953), United States federal judge
George Daniels (footballer, born 1912) (1912–1984), English footballer
George Daniels (footballer, born 1898) (1898–1985), English footballer, played for Altrincham, Bury, Preston North End, Rochdale and Ellesmere Port Town
George Daniels (cricketer) (1807–1853), English cricketer
George Daniels (baseball), American baseball player
George Daniels (athlete) (1950–2005), Ghanaian sprinter
George William Daniels (1878–1937), English professor of economics

See also
George Daniel (disambiguation)
Daniels (disambiguation)